Alice Braga Moraes (born 15 April 1983) is a Brazilian actress and producer. She has appeared in several Brazilian films, starring as Angélica in the acclaimed City of God (2002), Karinna in Lower City (2005), and Dolores in Only God Knows (2006).

Braga came to international prominence after appearing opposite Will Smith in I Am Legend (2007), and has since become a familiar face in Hollywood, having appeared in films such as Predators (2010), The Rite (2011), Elysium (2013), The Shack (2017), Soul (2020), and The Suicide Squad (2021). She portrayed the starring role of Teresa Mendoza in the crime drama-thriller television series Queen of the South (2016–2021).

Early life
Alice Braga Moraes was born in São Paulo and raised in a Catholic family. She speaks fluent English, Portuguese, and Spanish.

Her exposure to acting came at an early age; both her mother Ana Braga and aunt Sônia Braga are actresses, and Braga often accompanied them to film sets. She began her career by appearing in school plays and commercials. Her first commercial was for yogurt when she was 8 years old. As a teenager, she began pursuing roles in television and films.

Career
Braga made her acting debut in the Portuguese-language short film Trampolim (1998) and then returned to her schooling. Her breakthrough came when she was cast as Angélica in the critically acclaimed crime film City of God (2002), for which she received a Best Supporting Actress nomination from the Cinema Brazil Grand Prize. Afterward, she attended university while appearing in a pair of well-regarded South American films: Lower City (2005) and Only God Knows (2006). She also appeared in the popular Brazilian television program Carandiru, Outras Historias (2005).

Braga made her English-language debut with a starring role alongside Brendan Fraser, Mos Def, and Catalina Sandino Moreno in the crime thriller Journey to the End of Night (2006), which premiered at the 5th Annual Tribeca Film Festival. She received further recognition when was then cast opposite Will Smith in the blockbuster action thriller I Am Legend (2007). She subsequently had roles in the David Mamet-directed martial arts film Redbelt (2008), alongside Chiwetel Ejiofor, the post-apocalyptic thriller Blindness (2008), alongside Julianne Moore and Mark Ruffalo, and the crime drama Crossing Over (2009), alongside Harrison Ford, Ray Liotta, and Ashley Judd.

Braga portrayed Beth in the science fiction film Repo Men (2010). She starred as Isabelle in Nimród Antal's science fiction action film Predators (2010), which was shot and produced by Troublemaker Studios and Robert Rodriguez. Braga appeared as Frey Santiago in Neill Blomkamp's science fiction action film Elysium (2013), co-starring Matt Damon and Jodie Foster. In 2014, she starred as Vania in the Brazilian jungle film The Ardor, as Olivia in the Argentine romance drama Latitudes, and as Alice Taylor in Kriv Stenders' action-thriller Kill Me Three Times.

In 2016, Braga starred as Marisol Kingston in the western drama The Duel, alongside Liam Hemsworth and Woody Harrelson. In 2017, she starred as Sophia in the Christian drama The Shack, alongside Octavia Spencer and Sam Worthington, based on the novel of the same name.

From 2016 to 2021, Braga starred in the crime drama series Queen of the South, produced for USA Network, an adaptation of Arturo Perez-Reverte's best-selling novel La Reina del Sur. The series marked Braga's first lead American television role. She previously had small supporting roles in a non-English television series.

Braga starred as Cecilia Reyes in the superhero horror film The New Mutants, which was released in 2020. She starred as Maggie Teixeira in the HBO drama miniseries We Are Who We Are, which was written and directed by filmmaker Luca Guadagnino. Braga appeared in the superhero action film The Suicide Squad, which was released in August 2021.

Personal life
In January 2020, Braga revealed she has been in a three-year relationship with actress Bianca Comparato.

Braga maintains residences in Los Angeles, California, and São Paulo, Brazil.

Filmography

Film

Television

Video games

Awards and nominations

References

External links

 
 
 
 
 
 
 Interview with Alice Braga, star of 'Lower City' by Peter Fraser, Close-Up Film (archived 2007)

1983 births
Living people
20th-century Brazilian actresses
21st-century Brazilian actresses
21st-century Brazilian LGBT people
Actresses from São Paulo
Brazilian Christians
Brazilian expatriate actresses in the United States
Brazilian film actresses
Brazilian film producers
Brazilian television producers
Brazilian LGBT actors
LGBT actresses
LGBT Christians
LGBT film producers
LGBT television producers